Dan Monti, also known by his stage name Del Rey Brewer or simply Brewer, is an American musician, record producer and audio engineer who has worked with such bands as Metallica, Slayer and Guns N' Roses. The bulk of his work, however, has been in conjunction with Buckethead, with whom he has also toured as a bassist.

Musical career
Monti is a guitarist and bassist, frequently adding bass parts to Buckethead albums. He is also the lead guitarist for the Serj Tankian's touring band Flying Cunts of Chaos.
The band released their first single "Daysheet Blues" on iTunes in July 2010. He is also the lead vocalist for F.C.C.

He toured with Buckethead and Brain in 2017.

Production career
Monti has been credited on many albums in his career, the first being Bucketheadland 2 in 2003. He has since gone on to produce most of Buckethead's albums, a few examples being Pepper's Ghost, Decoding the Tomb of Bansheebot, and Cyborg Slunks. The first one contains a track "Brewer in the Air", presumably inscribed to Del Rey Brewer. He is also credited on many of these albums as the bassist, as well as co-writer and mixer. 

Monti has contributed to many high-profile bands' albums, including Serj Tankian's solo albums. He is listed for "additional engineering" or as "assistant engineer" on Guns N' Roses album Chinese Democracy, on which Buckethead also featured, as well as being credited for "digital editing" on Metallica's Death Magnetic and Slayer's World Painted Blood.

References

Year of birth missing (living people)
Living people
American record producers
American audio engineers
American heavy metal guitarists
American heavy metal bass guitarists
Deli Creeps members
20th-century births